National Tertiary Route 716, or just Route 716 (or ) is a National Road Route of Costa Rica, located in the Alajuela province.

Description
In Alajuela province the route covers Grecia canton (Puente de Piedra district), Atenas canton (Santa Eulalia district).

References

Highways in Costa Rica